Central Electronics Engineering Research Institute (CEERI), located at Pilani, Jhunjhunu District, Rajasthan and Chennai, Tamil Nadu is a research institute in India and a constituent laboratory of Council of Scientific and Industrial Research (CSIR India), New Delhi. It was established in 1953 for advanced research and development in the field of Electronics.

Since its inception, it has been working for the growth of electronics in the country and has established the required infrastructure and well experienced manpower for undertaking R&D in the following major areas :

 Cyber Physical Systems 
 Microwave Tubes
 Smart Sensors

The Chennai center focuses on process control instrumentation and automation as well as machine vision technologies.

Notes

Research institutes in Chennai
Engineering research institutes
Research institutes in Rajasthan
Electronics industry in India
Research institutes in Tamil Nadu
1953 establishments in Madras State
Research institutes established in 1953